Green's Literal Translation or the Literal Translation of the Holy Bible (LITV) is a translation of the Bible by Jay P. Green, Sr., first published in 1985. The LITV takes a literal, formal equivalence approach to translation. The Masoretic Text is used as the Hebrew basis for the Old Testament, and the Textus Receptus is used as the Greek basis for the New Testament. This translation is available in book form and is freely available online for use with the e-Sword software program. Some also refer to it as the "KJ3" or "KJV3" (KJ = King James).

The translation was integrated into the 1986 edition of Green's Hebrew-English-Greek Interlinear Bible.

Translation philosophy

Explaining his translation philosophy for the LITV, the Green stated, regarding the Old Testament: 
The Hebrews were basically a pastoral people. Their language originally was pictorial, and as such it was descriptive by nature. For example, their place names were descriptive: 'The Graves of Lust; The Valley of the Giants,' etc. In this volume these true meanings are revealed, not mere transliteration of the Hebrew letters being made to suffice. The personification of everything (there were no neuters to the Hebrews, nor any merely secular objects), gleams through a literal translation -- for all things and all men were perceived in relation to God Almighty. This literal translation tends to bring the reader into the frame of mind that 
existed in the times the Biblical words were written. That then promotes a full understanding. 

Green's translation renders the Tetragrammaton (יהוה YHWH) as Jehovah in 6,866 places throughout the Old Testament. With respect to the transliteration of the Tetragrammaton, Green opined that the worst approach was to transliterate the name as LORD, writing that "Every nation had their lords, but only Israel had Jehovah as their God. All other countries were the nations."

Regarding his translation philosophy and the New Testament, the author stated:
As for the Greek, it is noted as a language that has a word for every occasion. This vivid variety of expression is evident in the Holy Scriptures. Yet the Greek commonly in use, rather than the classical Greek, was written by Peter the unlearned fisherman, Luke the learned Physician, and by Paul the trained theologian. In conveying to the Bible student the commands and principles of God, it is important that the translator also convey in literal, simple English what God has written for His people. A translation of the Bible is no place to show off the vocabulary and erudition of the translator. 

In addition, every precaution was taken to preserve the particulars of the text; each verb is carefully scrutinized to maintain its tense, number, voice and mood; the case of each noun examined to retain its proper function in sentence; each participle carefully translated to preserve its aspect. Sense words (words added by the translator to make a sentence more intelligible) are kept to an absolute minimum without sacrificing readability, and when used are always bracketed so that you know which words are God's and which are the translator's. You won't find a more literal rendition of the very words of God in any other version (not even in the NASB)!

There are mysterious things, things hard to understand (2 Peter 3:15,16) in the Scriptures, but it is not the literal meanings of the Hebrew or Greek words that cause this to be so. The "different gospel" preached by those "troubling you and desiring to pervert the gospel of Christ," cannot be justly derived from the literal words written by the Divine penmen, for these holy men were "borne along by the Holy Spirit," (1 Peter 1:21). This plan of this volume is not to lead (or mislead) the reader, but to bring him or her face to face with God by simply giving the literal meanings of the words which He had written for our spiritual direction. In doing this we adhere to His maxim, "Let God be true, and every man a liar" (Romans 3:4).

Comparisons

Examples comparing the LITV to the King James Version and other Bible versions based on the same Hebrew and Greek manuscripts:

References

External links
 LITV on StudyBible.info

1985 books
1985 in Christianity
Bible translations into English